Concordia University, Nebraska is a private Lutheran university in Seward, Nebraska. It was established in 1894 and is affiliated with the Lutheran Church–Missouri Synod as one of seven schools in the Concordia University System. The university is organized into three schools: the College of Arts and Sciences, the College of Education, and the College of Graduate Studies.

History

Founding and early years
The school, then named the Evangelisches Lutherisches Schullehrer-Seminar (Evangelical Lutheran Teachers' Seminary), was officially dedicated on November 18, 1894. Two days later classes began with its 13 students boarded, fed, and taught in the same building (now Founders Hall) by J. George Weller and his wife. Students were originally taught for three years before transferring to Addison Teachers Seminary to continue their instruction.

The academic programs were expanded in 1905 with the addition of two years of college studies. By 1908, a fourth year of high school was added to the program. Throughout the early years, the local community provided support to "The German College", as it was unofficially termed, including foodstuffs, housing, and funding. While most classes were conducted in German, English was also taught and used.

With the outbreak of World War I in 1914, the school faced significant anti-German sentiment by the local populace despite Director Jesse's support as a Four Minute Man. In a demonstration of their American pride, the school changed the language of all its classes to English and constructed a  flagpole, said to be the tallest in the county. After the war, the school was accredited as a junior college and became co-ed in 1919 although women boarded with families off-campus. In December 1918, the Lutheran Seminary, as the university was then named, suffered infection during the 1918 flu pandemic with at least 15% of the student body being infected and one student dying. The school suffered another less-severe outbreak in 1920.

Concordia Teacher's College

The first bachelor's degrees were awarded in 1940, and the school became an accredited four-year institution in the late 1940s. In 1959, Concordia became the first of the LCMS schools to be accredited by the National Council for the Accreditation of Teacher Education. The school was named Concordia Teacher's College, reflecting the largest program until the addition of new fields of liberal arts majors in the 1970s. The school was again renamed to Concordia College from 1974 to 1998.

Additional educational and housing facilities were added as the university grew and expanded its programs, including science labs, a large library, and multiple residence halls. Business, art, science, and health-related programs were added to the teaching and pre-seminary courses. Graduate programs were added in 1968. With the increase in enrollment came new programs and professors, many who were housed along Faculty Lane.

Growth into university
The college became part of the newly established Concordia University System in 1995. and became a university in 1998 and was renamed Concordia University Nebraska. Concordia opened a  location in Lincoln's Fallbrook development to house graduate classes.

Throughout the 2000s Concordia's enrollment continued to grow with more students enrolling in programs outside the historical church-work degrees. Despite the growth of secular studies, the church-work programs continued to flourish with Concordia having graduated nearly 30% of LCMS church workers by 2019.

In 2009, the Walz Health and Human Performance Complex was completed, significantly improving the athletic facilities and performance spaces. The newest building on the campus is the Dunklau Center for Science, Math and Business, completed in 2019. The Dunklau Center added  primarily to the sciences while renovating existing spaces for other programs including the new agricultural program.

In 1996, the college hosted the first annual Plum Creek Children's Literacy Festival. The festival now brings nearly 10,000 school-aged students and teachers to campus to interact with authors and illustrators. It has included famous authors such as Lois Lowry, John R. Erickson, and Richard Peck. In 2021 the University canceled the Plum Creek Children's Literacy Festival two days before the event was scheduled after multiple authors and illustrators withdrew from the event upon learning of the school's opposition to homosexuality for religious reasons.

The current president of Concordia University is Dr. Bernard Bull.

Campus

The newest residence hall—Jonathan Hall—is an apartment-style-living facility. All of the campus's residence halls include internet access and cable telecommunications connections. The university grounds are home to a portion of the Nebraska Statewide Arboretum as well as a number of university-commissioned and student-made sculptures.

 Brommer Hall was originally built as a student center but was converted to a center for the arts. The building now contains offices, studio space, classrooms, and a computer lab.
 Bulldog Stadium was constructed in 1997 and hosts the athletic events of Concordia's track, football, and soccer teams in addition to intramurals and Seward High School football and soccer games.
 Founders Hall was originally built in 1894. As the original campus building, Founders supplied classrooms and living quarters for the first students, along with their teacher (Rev. J. George Weller) and his family. Currently, the Theatre Program's set-construction workshop operates in the basement. However, no classes meet in Founders Hall.
 Janzow Campus Center was recently renovated and is the hub of campus life. Janzow includes the dining hall and the Doghouse Grill, 10:31 Coffee House, John W. Cattle Conference Room, Student Success Center, game room and lounges, mail room, Student Activities Council Office (SAC), and the Bookstore.
 Jesse Hall was originally built in 1927 as a dormitory but now functions as office space for the business, communication, theology, and social science departments. Several classrooms and a computer lab are also present in the building. The Marxhausen Gallery of Art is located in the building with art visiting, original and archival shows on display. Jesse Hall also is the location for several organization offices including The Sower student newspaper and the Center for Liturgical Art, an outreach program to creates original pieces of ecclesiastical artwork for churches, schools, and religious organizations.
 Link Library houses over 230,000 titles, as well as the Bartels Museum, the Instructional Technology Center, and the Academic Resource Center and Writing Center.
 Music Center is the home for many performing arts studies at Concordia. Offices for the music department are located here as well as a number of practice rooms equipped with pianos and organs. In 2008, a Casavant Freres pipe organ was installed in the recital hall, Heine Hall, along with a new Steinway piano. A computer lab provides music students with software for composition. A black box theater in the basement of the center serves as a venue for intimate theatrical performances throughout the year. The building is currently under renovation to construct new rehearsal, performance, and recording facilities and is scheduled to be completed fall 2022.  
 The Osten Observatory houses a Meade LX-200 16” telescope in a Sirius Observatories 10-foot fiberglass dome. Students and faculty host regular public viewing in the spring and fall, and use the Meade DSI CCD imager for photography and research.
 The newly renovated Dunklau Center hosts classes in science, mathematics, and business. The building includes laboratories for physics, biology, and chemistry with state-of-the-art equipment. The building also contains a greenhouse as well as a cadaver lab for the study of human anatomy.
 Thom Leadership Education Center (TLEC) includes many state of the art classrooms along with an auditorium, computer labs, and the offices of the education department.
 Walz Human Performance Complex and the Physical Education Building are home to athletics and the health and Human Performance department. Facilities include locker rooms, weight rooms, laundry and training facilities, a gymnasium and 2,000-seat arena, and a 200-meter indoor track and field house.
 Weller Hall is the administrative center of campus as it houses the business, marketing, admissions, financial service, and human resource departments. The offices of the provost and university president are also located there. An auditorium hosts daily chapel services as well as theatrical productions. Weller also provides several classrooms for instruction.
The Heartfelt Memorial features several sculptures and a garden dedicated to the memory of deceased children. It was completed in 2015.

Academics
The university is organized into three schools—the College of Arts and Sciences, the College of Education, and the College of Graduate Studies. Concordia University is institutionally accredited by the Higher Learning Commission. The teacher education programs are accredited by the Council for the Accreditation of Educator Preparation (CAEP); music programs are accredited by the National Association of Schools of Music (NASM); and the institution's business program is accredited by the International Assembly for Collegiate Business Education (IACBE).

Undergraduate
Concordia awards bachelor's degrees in more than 50 undergraduate programs. In addition, the university awards the Lutheran Teacher Diploma, Christian Teacher Diploma, the Director of Christian Education, and Director of Parish Music certificate. Graduates of these programs serve as rostered church workers in the Lutheran Church–Missouri Synod. Pre-seminary and pre-deaconess programs are also available, including the necessary language courses to attend the seminaries of the LCMS.

Graduate
Concordia University offers several master's degrees. These programs offer a majority of their courses online. Most face-to-face classes meet in Lincoln, Neb.

Student life

As of August 23, 2022, the student body included 1,124 undergraduate students. 52% of students are male and 48% are female. Students are expected to uphold biblical practices in line with LCMS doctrine including sexual relations between heterosexual, married couples.

Residence halls
There are currently 11 residence halls (dormitories) on the university's Seward campus. These dorms are separated by gender, with the exclusion of Jonathan Hall. The following is a list of the current Residential Halls:

The dormitories are supervised by resident assistants and resident coordinators who are overseen by the Student Life Office.

Extracurricular activities
Over 30 clubs and organizations exist on campus, ranging from service-oriented groups to intramural teams to academic support groups to honorary societies. The Sower is the university's bi-weekly newspaper. The Tower is the title of the institution's yearbook. The "Curtain Club" provides students with a medium of expression through drama. The Student Activity Committee (SAC) organizes multiple events for the student body throughout the year, including concerts, comedy shows, free movies, bowling nights and the popular Spring Weekend. Concordia also runs a Speech and Debate team coached by Joseph Davis as of October 2018.

Visual arts 
Concordia's art students publicly exhibit their artwork at the on-campus Marxhausen Gallery of Art (named after the artist Reinhold Marxhausen) for both the Annual Student Art Exhibition and the Bachelor of Fine Art Thesis Exhibition. The Marxhausen Gallery also intermittently hosts visiting artists from around the country who give presentations and display their art. The university's permanent collection of more than 300 works, the Koenig Collection, contains screen prints, etchings, lithographs and other original prints by nationally and internationally recognized artists. The Center for Liturgical Art at Concordia seeks to encourage and assist the Church in its ministry through the visual arts by promoting its use in worship. Students work alongside faculty and visiting artists to create a variety of pieces.

Homosexual lifestyle prohibition
Concordia University's handbook prohibits "active involvement in a homosexual lifestyle" and specifies disciplinary action against students breaking this rule. This is one of several matters related to sexuality that the handbook holds to be sinful.
 
Concordia publishes a journal, Issues in Christian Education, that often contains writing about the sinful nature of homosexuality. In 2021, the Plum Creek Literacy Festival at Concordia was canceled because authors withdrew their participation in the festival in protest of Concordia's LGBT prohibition. The festival had excluded books with LGBT characters by Eliot Schrefer and another author.

Athletics

The Concordia–Nebraska athletic teams are called the Bulldogs. The university is a member of the National Association of Intercollegiate Athletics (NAIA), primarily competing in the Great Plains Athletic Conference (GPAC) since the 1969–70 academic year. The school mascot is the Bulldog.

Concordia–Nebraska competes in 23 intercollegiate varsity sports: Men's sports include baseball, basketball, cross country, football, golf, powerlifting, soccer, tennis, track & field and wrestling; while women's sports include basketball, cheerleading, cross country, dance, golf, powerlifting, soccer, softball, tennis, track & field and volleyball; and co-ed sports include eSports and shooting sports.

Accomplishments
The Bulldogs have won three NAIA National Championships: men's outdoor track & field (2015), women's outdoor track & field (2016), and women's basketball (2019). Concordia's softball team appeared in two Women's College World Series in 1970 and 1971. The university also has many intramural sports.

Facilities
Concordia Nebraska's teams use the newly constructed Walz Human Performance Complex, Bulldog Stadium, and Plum Creek Park baseball and softball fields for competitions.

Concordia Invitational Tournament (CIT)
Since 1950, Concordia has competed in an annual men's basketball tournament against other LCMS universities. A women's tournament was added in 1965. Throughout the history of CIT, Concordia Nebraska holds the best aggregate record in both the men's and women's tournaments. Since 2001 the teams are: Concordia University, Nebraska, Concordia University Wisconsin, Concordia University Chicago and Concordia University, Ann Arbor.

Notable people

Alumni
Dan Cloeter - Runner including winner of the 1977 and 1979 Chicago Marathon
Jeanne Combs - Nebraska state representative from the 32nd District from 2003 to 2007
Toby Down - Professional soccer player
Gris Grimly (Steven Soenksen) - Illustrator and author
Mary Ann Hanusa - Iowa state representative from 2011 to 2021
Alice Hausman - Member of the Minnesota House of Representatives since 1989
Amanda Husberg - Composer of hymns 
Kenlon Johannes - Businessman and CEO of Kansas Soybean Commission and Association
Frederick C. Luebke - Historian
David Morgan - Professor and scholar
Brian Mueller - President of Grand Canyon University 
Tom Mueller - College football coach
Brian Naber - College football coach
John Seevers - College football coach
Roby Smith - Iowa state senator from the 47th District since 2011
Annette Sweeney - Iowa state senator from the 25th District since 2018 and member of the Iowa House of Representatives from 2009 to 2013
Robert Sylwester - Emeritus professor of education at the University of Oregon and recipient of awards for cognitive neuroscience research
Andrea von Kampen - folk singer and songwriter

Faculty
Bernard Bull - University president and scholar
Ron Harms - College football coach
Alan Harre - University president and administrator
Reinhold Marxhausen - Artist
Ralph Starenko - College football coach

Notes

References

External links

 Official website
 Official athletics website

 
Universities and colleges affiliated with the Lutheran Church–Missouri Synod
Great Plains Athletic Conference schools
Education in Seward County, Nebraska
Buildings and structures in Seward County, Nebraska
Private universities and colleges in Nebraska
Educational institutions established in 1894
1894 establishments in Nebraska